The I-218  was an attack aircraft designed and built in the USSR from  1947.

Development 
Alekseyev designed the I-218 as a heavily armed, and armoured, attack aircraft for use in close support and anti-tank missions. The twin boom aircraft had a central nacelle housing the pilot and gunners cockpits as well as the engine and forward firing armament. All armoured and highly stressed parts were manufactured from 30KhGSNA nickel-steel. Flight testing may have commenced in 1948, but there is no direct evidence of this. Shortly after completion Alekseyev's OKB was closed and Alekseyev was sent to TsAGI (Tsentrahl'nyy Aerodinamicheskiy i Ghidrodinamicheskiy Institoot- central aerodynamics and hydrodynamics institute) before being given the task of supervising Dr. Brunolf Baade and his German team at OKB-1. The designation I-218 is in doubt and the aircraft may have been called, simply 218.

Variants 
 I-219 - (a.k.a. I-218-Ib) Tailwheel undercarriage, revised crew compartment and swept fins.
 I-221 - (a.k.a. I-218-II) Enlarged jet-powered aircraft with one Lyulka TR-3 turbojet
 I-220 - (a.k.a. I-218-III) The I-218-III powered with the Dobrynin VD-4 without turbo-chargers, driving pusher contra-props at the rear of the fuselage.

Specifications (I-218)

See also

References

 Gunston, Bill. “The Osprey Encyclopaedia of Russian Aircraft 1875–1995”. London, Osprey. 1995. 
 Gordon, Yefim. & Gunston, Bill “SovietX-Planes”. Hinkley, Midland. 2000.

External links
 http://issuu.com/jeanlulu/docs/-aviation--soviet-x-planes--yefim-gordon---bill-gu/39

1940s Soviet attack aircraft